Ivana Kapitanović (born 17 September 1994) is a Croatian handballer for Rapid București and the Croatian national team.

She participated at the 2018 European Women's Handball Championship. She was supposed to participate at the 2020 European Women's Handball Championship where was Croatia surprisingly won the bronze medal, however she was not played due to a severe knee injury, but she was at the reception of the national team in the Zagreb Airport received the medal which was handed to her by a former Metz Handball's teammate Ćamila Mičijević.

Achievements

National
Croatian First League:
Winner: 2010, 2011, 2012, 2013, 2015, 2016, 2017, 2018
Croatian Cup:
Winner: 2010, 2011, 2012, 2013, 2015, 2016, 2017
French Women's Handball Championship:
Winner: 2019, 2022
Coupe de France:
Winner: 2019, 2022

Individual
Croatian Player of the Year: 2019

References

1994 births
Living people
Sportspeople from Split, Croatia
People from Solin
Croatian female handball players
Expatriate handball players
Croatian expatriate sportspeople in France
Mediterranean Games medalists in handball
Mediterranean Games bronze medalists for Croatia
Competitors at the 2013 Mediterranean Games
RK Podravka Koprivnica players
21st-century Croatian women